Texas State Highway 61 (SH 61) is a  state highway in southeast Texas. It connects Anahuac in Chambers County to Devers in Liberty County.

Route description
The southern terminus of SH 61 is in Anahuac, along Washington Avenue; state maintenance begins just south of Stowell Street. The route travels north into Anahuac before turning to the east. It passes the Chambers County Airport before an intersection with  SH 65; SH 61 turns to the north, while SH 65 continues east. SH 61 crosses I-10 near the community of Turtle Bayou, northeast of Lake Anahuac. The route travels north into Liberty County before reaching its northern terminus in Devers at  US 90.

History
SH 61 was designated on August 21, 1923 from Devers to Anahuac replacing part of SH 35A (the rest was cancelled). Its official designation has remained unchanged since the 1939 redescription of the Texas highway system.

Major intersections

References

061
Transportation in Chambers County, Texas
Transportation in Liberty County, Texas